Weiskirchen transmitter,  is a mediumwave broadcasting tower in Weiskirchen, Germany.  It is the property of  Hessischer Rundfunk.  It was built in 1967

Frequency and transmission diagrams 
The Weiskirchen transmitter broadcast on a frequency a 594 kHz. Until the conversion of medium-wave transmission frequencies to by nine divisible kilohertz values, its transmission frequency was 593 kHz. Until 1994 the transmitting power was 400 kW.
In 1994, it was reduced to 300 kW. 

Weiskirchen transmitter has a directional antenna, which consists of two 126.5-metre-tall guyed lattice steel mast radiators (coordinates:  and ) insulated against ground. 

As opposed to other guyed masts used for medium wave transmission, its guys are not partitioned with insulators. Instead they are grounded over coils situated directly close to the anchor block, which are so tuned, that high frequency currents in the guys are as low as possible.
  
The Weiskirchen transmitter forms together with Hoher Meissner transmitter a single frequency network. The directive pattern of the transmitter has a maximum toward northwest and two minima pointing toward northeast and southeast. By regulation of the feeding power for each mast, the directivity pattern can be changed, in cooperation with Hoher Meissner transmitter the maximum even to the east.

Operation
A signal is transmitted by cable from the studio in Frankfurt to Weiskirchen transmitter. The transmitter uses two water-cooled final stages, which are switched in parallel, in order to avoid a complete transmitter failure in case of a failure of a single tube. The power supply takes place under normal conditions from the local electricity 20kV grid. 

As backup, there is a Diesel generator, which starts in a period of 10 to 20 seconds. The current for starting the generator is supplied by a small accumulator unit, which is connected automatically at power failure. If the Diesel generator is used as power source, transmission power is reduced to 100 kW.

Program Supply 
Weiskirchen and Hoher Meissner supplied without frequency shift mobile receivers as car radios with the first program of the Hessian Broadcasting Company. Until  1989 this program was predominantly radiated due to the large range of mediumwaves in the night hours by change of the directivity patterns of both transmitters towards east. 

Today the broadcast program is mainly the news program HR info. Between 19-22 o'clock programmes for foreign workers are transmitted. It is also used for the transmission of debates of the Bundestag and the Hessian federal state parliament or for other special life reports as live reports from soccer matches. It was planned to convert the Weiskirchen transmitter to digital broadcasting by using DRM transmissions.

References

External links 
 Transmission mast of Weiskirchen transmitter at Skyscraperpage
 Transmission mast of Weiskirchen transmitter at Skyscraperpage
 
 http://www.waniewski.de/id238.htm

Radio masts and towers in Germany
Radio masts and towers in Europe
Buildings and structures in Merzig-Wadern
1967 establishments in West Germany
Towers completed in 1967